Alison Lucille Hodgkinson (born 30 January 1977) is a South African former cricketer who played as a right-handed batter. She appeared in 3 Test matches, 38 One Day Internationals and 8 Twenty20 Internationals for South Africa between 2000 and 2012, and captained the side between 2003 and 2005. She played domestic cricket for Western Province and Boland.

References

External links

1977 births
Living people
Cricketers from East London, Eastern Cape
South African women cricketers
South Africa women Test cricketers
South Africa women One Day International cricketers
South Africa women Twenty20 International cricketers
South Africa women's national cricket team captains
Western Province women cricketers
Boland women cricketers
20th-century South African women
21st-century South African women